"Say You'll Be Mine" is a song by Christian music singer Amy Grant. It was released as the second single from her 11th studio album, House of Love, in the United Kingdom in October 1994. Unlike the previous singles from House of Love, "Say You'll Be Mine" was not released in the United States. On her 2004 DVD release, Greatest Videos 1986-2004, Grant revealed that "Say You'll Be Mine" was planned as a US single, but the label pulled its release at the last minute. On the UK Singles Chart, the song reached number 41.

Music video
Grant recorded a music video for the song, which was aired in both the US and the UK. The original album version is available on the 2004 DVD Greatest Videos 1986-2004

Trakc listing
UK CD single
 "Say You'll Be Mine" (radio mix)
 "Life's Gonna Change"
 "Say You'll Be Mine" (album version)
 "Heart in Motion" (Medley mix)

Personnel
 Amy Grant – lead and backing vocals 
 Keith Thomas – acoustic piano, synthesizers, bass programming
 Dann Huff – electric guitars 
 Mark Hammond – drum programming
 Ada Dyer – backing vocals 
 Judson Spence – backing vocals 
 Audrey Wheeler – backing vocals
 Martyn Phillips – remix

Charts

References

Amy Grant songs
1994 singles
Songs written by Wayne Kirkpatrick
Songs written by Keith Thomas (record producer)
Songs written by Amy Grant
1994 songs
Song recordings produced by Keith Thomas (record producer)
A&M Records singles